The Quarta Colônia State Park  is a state park in the state of Rio Grande do Sul, Brazil.
It protects an area of seasonal deciduous forest beside the dam of a hydroelectric power plant that started operation in 2001 on the Jacuí River. 
As of 2016 there was no management plan and the park had not been opened for visitors.

Location

The Quarta Colônia State Park is in the municipalities of Agudo and Ibarama, Rio Grande do Sul, on the left bank of the reservoir of the Dona Francisca dam on the Jacuí River.
It protects remnants of seasonal deciduous forest in the Atlantic Forest biome.

History

The Quarta Colônia State Park was created by governor Germano Antônio Rigotto by state decree 44.186 of 19 December 2005.
The park was created as environmental compensation for the Dona Francisca Hydroelectric Plant on the Jacuí River.
The main objective is to protect the forest remnants and species listed as endangered in Brazil such as red-spectacled amazon (Amazona pretrei), lowland paca (Cuniculus paca), brocket deer (Mazama species), Geoffroy's cat (Leopardus geoffroyi) and oncilla (Leopardus tigrinus).
As of 2016 land ownership had not been regularized, there was no management plan and no facilities for visiting the park.

Environment

The park includes hills, cliffs and gentle or steep slopes.
The forest has been affected by human activity, including clearings and selective extraction, and is in different stages of regeneration.

Notes

Sources

State parks of Brazil
Protected areas established in 2005
2005 establishments in Brazil
Protected areas of Rio Grande do Sul